Caladenia paludosa, commonly known as the swamp spider orchid, is a species of orchid endemic to the south-west of Western Australia. It has a single erect, hairy leaf and up to three red, greenish-yellow and cream-coloured flowers. It mostly grows in dense scrub and is one of the last of the similar spider orchids to flower.

Description 
Caladenia paludosa is a terrestrial, perennial, deciduous, herb with an underground tuber. Flowering occurs from September to early December.

Taxonomy and naming 
Caladenia paludosa was first described in 2001 by Stephen Hopper and Andrew Phillip Brown from a specimen collected near Bunbury and the description was published in Nuytsia. The specific epithet (paludosa) is a Latin word meaning "swampy" or "marshy" referring to the winter-wet swamps where this species grows.

Distribution and habitat 
The swamp spider orchid is found on the coastal plain between Gingin and Gracetown in the Jarrah Forest, Mallee, Swan Coastal Plain and Warren biogeographic regions. It grows in thick scrubland which is swampy in winter.

Conservation
Caladenia paludosa is classified as "not threatened" by the Western Australian Government Department of Parks and Wildlife.

References 

paludosa
Endemic orchids of Australia
Orchids of Western Australia
Plants described in 2001
Endemic flora of Western Australia
Taxa named by Andrew Phillip Brown